The Poor Law Board was established in the United Kingdom in 1847 as a successor body to the Poor Law Commission overseeing the administration of the Poor Law Amendment Act 1834. The new body was headed by a President, and with the Lord President of the Council, the Lord Privy Seal, the Home Secretary and the Chancellor of the Exchequer now added to the board as ex officio members.  The board was abolished in 1871 and replaced by the Local Government Board.

Presidents of the Poor Law Board, 1847-1871
Charles Buller 1847-1849
Matthew Talbot Baines 1849-1852
Sir John Trollope, Bt 1852
Matthew Talbot Baines 1852-1855
Edward Pleydell Bouverie 1855-1858
Thomas Sotheron-Estcourt 1858-1859
Charles Gordon-Lennox, styled Earl of March 1859
Charles Pelham Villiers 1859-1866
Gathorne Hardy 1866-1867
William Courtenay, 11th Earl of Devon 1867-1868
George Goschen 1868-1871
James Stansfeld 1871

Parliamentary Secretaries to the Poor Law Board, 1847-1871

Viscount Ebrington 1847-1851
Ralph William Grey 1851-1852
Frederick Knight 1852
Grenville Berkeley 1853-1856
Ralph Grey 1856-1858
Frederick Knight 1858-1859
Charles Gilpin 1859-1865
Viscount Enfield 1865-1866
Ralph Anstruther Earle 1866-1867
George Sclater-Booth 1867-1868
Sir Michael Hicks Beach, Bt 1868
Arthur Peel 1868-1871

Bibliography
Una and Her Paupers Florence Nightingale & Anon, Diggory Press

Further reading
 

Poor Law in Britain and Ireland
19th century in the United Kingdom
1847 establishments in the United Kingdom
1871 disestablishments in the United Kingdom